The Nieuw Amsterdam  was a Dutch ocean liner built in Rotterdam for the Holland America Line.

Construction and launch
Originally she was to be named Prinsendam; however, during construction, Holland America Line decided to name their new flagship Nieuw Amsterdam, in honor of the Dutch settlement of New Amsterdam, modern-day New York.

Construction on the new liner was carried out at the N.V. Rotterdam Drydock Company.  Christened by Queen Wilhelmina in April 1937, Nieuw Amsterdam was, at 36,982 tonnes, the largest liner ever constructed in the Netherlands up to that time.  Proudly she was dubbed the Dutch "Ship of peace" since there were no provisions for possible war use incorporated in her design.

At the time Nieuw Amsterdam was more completely protected against fire, had the largest air conditioning plant and the highest percentage of private baths of any ship afloat. The ship was also the only liner with a fully equipped and air-conditioned theater.

Interior

Their creation emerged in the spring of 1938, a light-colored and very spacious ship throughout, and although she had spacious public rooms, the colour scheme used gave her an even larger feel. Modern in every way, her owners proclaimed her "the ship of tomorrow". She followed the Art Deco trend of the day in both interior decorations and exterior design. The interiors were distinguished by fluorescent lighting, aluminum motifs, and gentle pastels throughout the ship that created an understated elegance that would make the liner a favorite among seasoned transatlantic passengers.

One of the ship's centerpieces was the first class restaurant, having a Moroccan leather ceiling which was adorned by numerous Murano glass light fixtures, and columns covered in gold leaf.  Tinted mirrors, ivory walls and satinwood furniture all contributed to create the luxurious atmosphere. The restaurant had no portholes or windows facing the open sea, making it depend solely on artificial illumination, a feature it shared with the first class restaurant on board the Normandie of 1935. There also were two swimming pools on board, one outdoor and the other indoors on E-deck, featuring expensive Delft tiling.

The Nieuw Amsterdam was the second ship in the world after the Normandie to boast a theater, a feature the larger and faster Queen Mary did not initially have. The deeply cushioned seats commanded an unobstructed view of the stage, and the egg-shaped contour of the auditorium took advantage of the latest in scientific sound-proofing materials and amplifying equipment to ensure perfect acoustics for concerts, dramatic performances and pre-release motion pictures.  Found at the front end of the Theatre was a striking mural in red, black and gold by Reyer Stolk.

A favorite rendezvous of many Nieuw Amsterdam passengers was the handsome First Class Smoking Room with its rich Circassian walnut paneling and deep, luxurious armchairs and settees. Flanked by two enclosed sun verandas extending to the sides of the ship, the Smoking Room had its own modern bar stocked with a connoisseur choice of fine liquors.

First Class staterooms on the Nieuw Amsterdam were unusually attractive, ranging in size from cozy single person cabins to elaborate cabins-de-luxe. The handsome and modern decorative scheme made the cabins comfortable spots for daytime and evening relaxation. All First Class cabins on Nieuw Amsterdam had a private bathroom, a unique feature which no previous liner could boast.

Early career
On April 23, 1938, the Nieuw Amsterdam set out on her sea trials, which were to take place on the North Sea.  Testing her speed and manoeuvring capability, the new vessel turned out to be all that she was supposed to be.  Upon her return from the sea trials, the Nieuw Amsterdam was transferred to Holland America ownership and officially registered in the Dutch merchant fleet.

The new liner's maiden voyage was on May 10, 1938, with arrival in New York May 17 with return begun May 21. Nieuw Amsterdam acclaim with titles such as "Ship of the Year" and, due to some features such as fire resistance, air conditioning and accommodations, "Ship of Tomorrow" by some.

Although she was neither as large or fast as many of her contemporaries, she was to be a popular liner for the Dutch and was showered with superlatives.  Her sleek outline and two slim funnels provided a striking profile and she soon garnered a loyal following amid stiff competition from great liners such as Cunard's Queen Mary and the superb Normandie of the French Line. Despite the fierce competition, Nieuw Amsterdam proved to be one of the few money-making vessels of the day.

Wartime service

The Netherlands’ “ship of peace” was not to enjoy the praise lavished on her for long. After only seventeen voyages, Nieuw Amsterdam was laid up at Hoboken, New Jersey in 1939 after the German invasion of Poland.  She would be idle for only a year, however, and was requisitioned by the British Ministry of Transport after the Netherlands fell to Hitler’s armies.  She would spend the remainder of the war years as a transport for troops and prisoners of war, despite the fact she had been constructed without the consideration of ever being used in a military capacity.

Nieuw Amsterdam, with a nominal troop capacity of 6,800 and speed of over 20 knots, was among the British-controlled "monsters" – high-capacity, high-speed troop ships capable of sailing unescorted due to their speed, and thus critical to the build up in Britain for the invasion of the Continent.

During the course of the conflict she transported over 350,000 troops and steamed around  before being returned to the Holland America Line in 1946. Directly after the war, she spent time repatriating Dutch citizens from the then-Dutch East Indies.

Refitting the Nieuw Amsterdam
The Nieuw Amsterdam triumphantly returned to her home port of Rotterdam on April 10, 1946. Fifteen weeks were required to remove the troop fittings: the special kitchens, alarm systems, hammocks, and 36 guns.

Then 2,000 tons of furniture and decorations were shipped to the Netherlands from wartime storage in San Francisco.  The furnishings were for the most part in very poor condition, a result of six years of neglect.  About 3,000 chairs and 500 tables were sent back to their original builders for reupholstering and refinishing.  One quarter of the furnishings had to be replaced entirely.

Factories and warehouses in Europe combed their supplies for materials and fabrics, much of which had been concealed from the Nazis during the occupation.  Many smaller parts, such as hinges and clamps, had to be made by hand, since the machinery that once made them had been stolen or destroyed by the enemy.

The entire rubber flooring was renewed, as was nearly all of the carpeting. All of the steel work was scaled and preserved and all piping cleaned.  All ceilings and floors were removed; all of the liners 374 bathrooms were rebuilt.  In the passenger spaces the wood paneling, which had been scratched and mutilated, was sanded down to half its thickness and relacquered.  All the cabin's closets and fixtures were replaced.  The entire electrical wiring system was renewed.

Having been painted over for blackouts and cracked in tropical climates,  of glass was refurbished.  Even the hand rails had to be repolished to eradicate thousands of carved initials.  The project was monumental, because of the material shortages and the decline of the number of skilled craftsmen.

On October 29, 1947, after 18 months at the shipyard, the Nieuw Amsterdam reentered transatlantic service.

Postwar career and demise

The refit took eighteen months and cost more than her original construction, but on October 29, 1947, the Nieuw Amsterdam was finally back on the transatlantic run. Her passenger accommodations had been slightly altered, and the ship emerged with a gross register tonnage some 400 tons larger than before, ending up at 36,667.

For the next twenty years Nieuw Amsterdam would enjoy a loyal following and financial success. Her several refits in the 1950s ensured she remained in top condition and continued service despite her being near thirty years of age. In 1967 severe boiler problems seemed to indicate an end to the venerable liner's career; however, new US Navy surplus boilers were installed during a sixteen-week shipyard period at Wilton-Fijenoord in Schiedam and her career continued.

In the same decade jet travel had made continued Atlantic passenger runs impractical, so Nieuw Amsterdam was shifted to cruising in the Caribbean.  Soon escalating operating cost and competition from newer cruise vessels meant an end to the grand liner's service career.  Nieuw Amsterdam had been an enduring icon on the North Atlantic for the better part of three decades—certainly her refined interiors and impeccable service added much to her appeal.

The ship sailed to the breakers in 1974.

See also
 
 Holland America Line

References

Notes

Bibliography

External links

 Photos of the SS Nieuw Amsterdam

Ocean liners
Cruise ships
Art Deco ships
1937 ships
Ships built in Rotterdam